Renato Pozzetto (born 14 July 1940) is an Italian actor, director, comedian, and singer.

Biography
Pozzetto was born into a working-class family from Milan and grew up in the town of Gemonio (in the Province of Varese). After graduation, he made his debut as a comedian at the Derby Club in Milan. In 1964, he and his childhood friend Cochi Ponzoni formed the duo Cochi & Renato. They recorded several successful songs, often written in collaboration with Enzo Jannacci. These songs often had a satirical and/or nonsense take. Their most popular hits include "La canzone intelligente" ("The intelligent song", a satire about songwriting) and  "E la vita, la vita". From the mid 1970s through the first half of the 1990s, Pozzetto enjoyed a prolific career in film, where he became famous for his trademark pronounced Milanese accent and for his shy and stuttering way of speaking.
In the mid 2000s, following almost two decades of separation, he reunited with Ponzoni.

Pozzetto has also lent his voice to Rocks, the dog protagonist of the movie Look Who's Talking Now, for the Italian dubbing.

Filmography

Actor

 Per amare Ofelia (1974) – Orlando Aliverti Mannetti
 La poliziotta (1974) - Claudio Ravassi
 A mezzanotte va la ronda del piacere (1975) – Fulvio
 Paolo Barca, maestro elementare, praticamente nudista (1975) – Paolo Barca
 Due cuori, una cappella (1975) – Aristide Cacciamani
 Babysitter - Un maledetto pasticcio (1975) – Gianni, Michélle's friend
 Di che segno sei? (1975) – Basilio
 The Career of a Chambermaid (1975) – Tenente Bruno (uncredited)
 Il padrone e l'operaio (1975) – Gianluca Tosi
 Un sorriso, uno schiaffo, un bacio in bocca (1975) – Himself
 Oh, Serafina! (1976) – Augusto Valle
 Sturmtruppen (1976) – Una recluta
 Luna di miele in tre (1976) – Alfredo Riva
 Tre tigri contro tre tigri (1977) – Don Cimbolano
 Ecco noi per esempio... (1977) – Palmambrogio Guanziroli
 Black Journal (1977) – Stella Kraus
 Io tigro, tu tigri, egli tigra (1978) – Elia
 Saxofone (1978) – Sax
 Per vivere meglio divertitevi con noi (1978) – Siro Sante (segment "Non si può spiegare, bisogna vederlo")
 Neapolitan Mystery (1979) – Inspector Voghera
 La patata bollente (1979) – Bernardo Mambelli, detto 'Il Gandhi'
 Agenzia Riccardo Finzi... praticamente detective (1979) – Riccardo Finzi
 Tesoro mio (1979) – Uff. Giudiziario Pierluigi
 I'm Photogenic (1980) – Antonio Barozzi
 Zucchero, miele e peperoncino (1980) – Plinio Carlozzi
 Fico d'India (1980) – Lorenzo Millozzi
 Mia moglie è una strega (1980) – Emilio Altieri
 Uno contro l'altro, praticamente amici (1981) – Franco Colombo
 Nessuno è perfetto (1981) – Guerrino Castiglione
 Culo e camicia (1981) – Renato
 Ricchi, ricchissimi... praticamente in mutande (1982) – Berto Del Prà
 Porca vacca (1982) – Primo Baffo detto Barbasini
 Testa o croce (1982) – Don Emidio / Father Remigio
 La casa stregata (1982) – Giorgio
 Questo e quello (1983) – Giulio (segment "Questo... amore impossibile") / Gregory (segment "Quello... col basco rosso")
 Un povero ricco (1983) – Eugenio Ronconi / Eugenio Ragona
 Mani di fata (1983) – Andrea Ferrini
 Il ragazzo di campagna (1984) – Artemio
 Lui è peggio di me (1985) – Luciano
 È arrivato mio fratello (1985) – Ovidio Ceciotti / Raf Benson
 Grandi magazzini (1986) – Fausto Valsecchi
 7 chili in 7 giorni  (1986) – Silvano Baracchi
 Noi uomini duri (1987) – Silvio
 Roba da ricchi (1987) – Don Vittorino
 Da grande (1987) – Marco
 Il volatore di aquiloni (1987) – Urca
 Casa mia, casa mia... (1988) – Mario Bartoloni
 Burro (1989) – Burro
 Le comiche (1990) – Renato
 Non più di uno (1990) – Piero
 Piedipiatti (1991) – Brigadiere Silvio Camurati
 Le comiche 2 (1991) – Renato
 Infelici e contenti (1992) – Aldo
 Ricky & Barabba (1992) – Ricky Morandi
 Anche i commercialisti hanno un'anima (1994) – Carlo Malinverni
 Le nuove comiche (1994) – Renato
 Miracolo italiano (1994) – Fermo Pulciani
 Mollo tutto (1995) – Franco Giacobetti
 Papà dice messa (1996) – Don Arturo
 Nebbia in Val Padana (2000, TV Series) 
 Un amore su misura (2007) – Corrado Olmi
 Oggi sposi (2009) – Renato Di Caio
 What a Beautiful Surprise (2015) – Giovanni (final film role)

Director
 Io tigro, tu tigri, egli tigra (1978) 
 Saxofone (1978) 
 Il volatore di aquiloni (1987)
 Papà dice messa (1996)
 Un amore su misura (2007)

References

External links 

1940 births
People from the Province of Varese
Living people
Italian male film actors
Italian comedy musicians
David di Donatello winners
Ciak d'oro winners